This is a list of the rulers of the Kingdom of Asturias, a kingdom in the Iberian peninsula during the Early Middle Ages. It originated as a refuge for Visigothic nobles following the conquest of Iberia by the Umayyad Caliphate. Following the forced abdication of Alfonso III by his sons in 910, the kingdom was split into three: Asturias, León, and Galicia. All three were reunited in 924 under the Kingdom of León.

For later kings, see the list of Leonese monarchs and the list of Galician monarchs.  From 1388, the title Prince of Asturias has been used for the heirs to the Castillian and Spanish thrones.

List

Timeline

Family tree

See also 
Kingdom of Asturias
Astur-Leonese dynasty

 
Lists of Spanish monarchs
Visigoths
Articles which contain graphical timelines